This is a list of conflicts in the Near East arranged; first, chronologically from the epipaleolithic until the end of the late modern period ( – c. AD 1945); second, geographically by sub-regions (starting from east to west; then, south to north). This list includes most present-day sovereign states (some of which may be disputed) beginning eastward from West and Central Asia (the Republic of Iraq, State of Kuwait, and Islamic republics of Iran, Pakistan, and Afghanistan), Syria (the Syrian Arab Republic and Hashemite Kingdom of Jordan), Transcaucasia (the republics of Azerbaijan, Armenia, Georgia, Abkhazia, Artsakh, and South Ossetia), Anatolia and Eastern Thrace (the Republic of Turkey), Arabian Peninsula (the Kingdom of Saudi Arabia, State of Qatar, United Arab Emirates, Sultanate of Oman, and Republic of Yemen), Levant (the Lebanese Republic, Republic of Cyprus, Turkish Republic of Northern Cyprus, and the states of Israel and Palestine), Northeast Africa (the Arab Republic of Egypt and Republic of the Sudan), and Northwest Africa (the State of Libya, Republic of Tunisia, People's Democratic Republic of Algeria, Kingdom of Morocco, Sahrawi Arab Democratic Republic, and Islamic Republic of Mauritania). Also listed might be any raid, strike, skirmish, siege, sacking, and/or battle (both land and naval) that occurred on the territories of a modern country occupying what may today be referred to as the "Middle East" (or the "Ancient Near East" when in reference to this region's military history during classical antiquity); however, was itself only part of an operation of a campaign in a theater of a greater, interregional war (e.g. any and/or all border, undeclared, colonial, proxy, liberation, world wars, etc.) There may also be periods of violent, civil unrest listed; such as, shootouts, spree killings, massacres, terrorist attacks, coups, assassinations, regicides, riots, rebellions, revolutions, and civil wars (as well as wars of succession and/or independence). The list might also contain episodes of human sacrifice, mass suicide, and ethnic cleansing/genocide.

Ancient times

Bronze Age

Egypt

Early Dynastic Period of Egypt
c. 3100 BC Unification of Upper and Lower Egypt
Second Intermediate Period of Egypt
1580–1550 BC Hyksos-Seventeenth Dynasty of Egypt wars in Lower Egypt
New Kingdom of Egypt
1550/1549-1531 BC Conquest of Hyksos-ruled Lower Egypt by Ahmose I of the Eighteenth Dynasty of Egypt
c.1537 BCE Ahmose I's campaigns to Syria and Nubia.
16 April 1457 BCE Battle of Megiddo – a battle between Ancient Egyptian forces under the pharaoh Thutmose III and a large Canaanite coalition.
Battle of Kadesh, fought in May 1247 BCE between Ramses II and the Hittite Empire.

Mesopotamia

Early Dynastic Period of Mesopotamia
c. 2500 BC Enmebaragesi of Kish subdued Elam
c. 2500 BC Aga of Kish, the son of Enmebaragesi of Kish, besieged Uruk
c. 2500 BC Enmerkar of Uruk's year-long siege of Aratta
c. 2500 BC Dumuzid of Uruk captured Enmebaragesi of Kish single-handed
c. 2500 BC Enshakushanna of Uruk conquered Hamazi, Akkad, Kish, and Nippur, claiming hegemony over all of Sumer. Enshakushanna was succeeded in Uruk by Lugal-kinishe-dudu, but the hegemony seems to have passed to Eannatum of Lagash for a time
c. 2500 BC Eannatum of Lagash conquered all of Sumer, including Ur, Nippur, Akshak, Larsa, and Uruk (controlled by Enshakushanna)
c. 2500 BC En-anna-tum I of Lagash succeeded his brother Eannatum and defended Lagash against Ur-Lumma of Umma
c. 2500 BC Entemena of Lagash succeeded his father En-anna-tum I and re-established Lagash as a power in Sumer. He defeated Illi of Umma, with the aid of Lugal-kinishe-dudu of Uruk (the successor to Enshakushanna)
c. 2500 BC Lugal-Anne-Mundu of Adab subjected the "Four-Quarters" of the world – i.e., the entire Fertile Crescent region, from the Mediterranean to the Zagros Mountains
c. 2355 BC – 2334 BC (middle chronology) Lugal-zage-si of Umma conquered several of the Sumerian city-states – including Kish, where he overthrew Ur-Zababa; Lagash, where he overthrew Urukagina; Ur, Nippur, and Larsa; as well as Uruk
Akkadian Period
c. 2334 – 2270 BC Sargon of Akkad established a vast empire which is thought to have included large parts of Mesopotamia, and included parts of modern-day Iran, Asia Minor and Syria
Conquest of Elam
c. 2271 BC Battle of Uruk
Syria and Canaan campaigns
Akkadian conquest of Ebla
Magan revolt
Lullubi campaign of Naram-sin
Gutian period
c. 2193 – c. 2123 BC Gutian attacks on the Akkadian Empire
c. 2123 BC – 2112 BC After defeating the Gutian ruler Tirigan in Sumer with the aid of other cities, Utu-hengal of Uruk established himself as the king of Sumer
Ur III period
c. 2112 BC – 2094 BC (Short chronology) Ur-Nammu of Ur conquered Lagash
c. 2004 BC (Short chronology) Elamite Sack of Ur
Isin-Larsa period
c. 1830 BC – 1817 BC (Short chronology) The Amorite chieftain Sumu-abum won independence from the city-state Kazallu
c. 1752 BC – 1730 BC (Short chronology) Damiq-ilishu of Isin, the last king mentioned in the Sumerian King List, is defeated by Sin-Muballit of Babylon
Old Babylonian period
c. 1792 BC – 1750 BC (Short chronology) Hammurabi of Babylon extended Babylon's control over Mesopotamia by winning a series of wars against neighboring kingdoms
Kassite dynasty
c. 1595 BC Fall of Babylon
c. 1507 BC (Short chronology) Kassite attacks on Babylon

Levant

c. 2492 BC Battle between Haik and Nimrod
c. 2300 BC Mari-Ebla's Hundred Years War
c. 2300 BC Battle of Terqa
c. 2000 BC Battle of Siddim
c. 1900 BC Qatna-Yamhad conflict
c. 1770 BC Yamhad kingdom conquests
c. 1650 BC - 1600 BC Hittite-Syrian Wars
Israelite Campaigns
Early Israelite campaigns
1400 BC Battle of Ai (legendary)
Battle of Hazor (legendary)
Battle of Jericho (legendary)
Lachish
Battle of the Waters of Merom (legendary)
c. 14th century BC "Syrian Wars"
c. 1247 BC Battle of Kadesh

Anatolia

c. 1650 BC – 1600 BC Conquests of Hattusili I and Mursili I
c. 1430 BC – 1350 BC Kaska invasions of Hatti

Early Iron Age
Note: This section is covering Iron Age I and II, Iron Age III is related as Classic Period

Ancient Egypt conflicts
1279 BC – 1213 BC Ramesses II campaigns in the Near East
First Syrian campaign
Second Syrian campaign 
1274 BC Battle of Kadesh
Third Syrian campaign
Third Intermediate Period of Egypt
925 BC Sack of Jerusalem
727 BC Kushite Invasion to Egypt
609 BC Battle of Megiddo – a battle between the Kingdom of Egypt and the Kingdom of Judah
Ancient Anatolia conflicts
1260 BC – 1240 BC Trojan War
Ancient Mesopotamia conflicts
Kassite period
c. 1232 BC – 1225 BC (Short chronology) Tukulti-Ninurta I of Assyria defeated Kashtiliash IV, the Kassite king of Babylon and captured the city of Babylon to ensure full Assyrian supremacy over Mesopotamia
c. 1157 BC – 1155 BC (Short chronology) Enlil-nadin-ahi, the final king of the Kassite dynasty that had ruled over Babylon, was defeated by Kutir-Nahhunte of Elam, the successor of Shutruk-Nakhunte
Fourth Babylonian Dynasty
c. 1125 BC – 1104 BC (Short chronology) Nebuchadnezzar I of Isin's War with Elam
Israelite Campaigns
Later Israelite Campaigns
1000 BC Siege of Jebus
Assyrian campaigns
853 BC Battle of Qarqar
721 BC Assyrian conquest of Israel
Second Assyrian invasion to Southern Levant
701 BC Siege of Lachish
701 BC Assyrian Siege of Jerusalem by Sennacherib
693 BC Battle of Diyala River (Pyrrhic Assyrian victory)
693 BC Siege of Babylon
626 BC Revolt of Babylon (Decisive Babylonian victory; eviction of Assyrian troops)
Neo-Babylonian campaigns 
612 BC Battle of Nineveh
605 BC Battle of Carchemish – a battle between the Kingdom of Egypt and Assyrian allies against the Neo-Babylonian Empire
 Jewish–Babylonian war
597 BC Siege of Jerusalem by Nebuchadnezzar II
587 BC Siege of Jerusalem by Nebuchadnezzar II
Median campaigns
28 May 585 BC Battle of Halys
Achaemenid conquests of Cyrus the Great
552 BC Persian Revolt
552 BC Battle of Hyrba
551 BC Battle of the Persian Border
550 BC Battle of Pasargadae
547 BC Battle of Pteria
547 BC Battle of Thymbra
547 BC Siege of Sardis
539 BC Battle of Opis

Classical antiquity

Greco-Persian domination

Ionian Revolt 499–493 BC
First Persian invasion of Greece 492–490 BC
Egyptian Revolt 486 BC
Second Persian invasion of Greece 480–478 BC
Wars of Delian League 477–449 BC
Wars of the Diadochi 322–275 BC
Syrian Wars 274–168 BC
First Syrian War (274–271 BC)
Second Syrian War (260–253 BC)
Third Syrian War (246–241 BC)
Fourth Syrian War (219–217 BC)
Fifth Syrian War (202–195 BC)
Sixth Syrian War (170–168 BC)
Seleucid–Parthian wars 238–129 BC
Roman–Syrian War 192–188 BC
Maccabean Revolt 167–160 BC

Roman, Parthian and Sassanid domination

Mithridatic Wars 88–63 BC
First Mithridatic War 88–84 BC
Second Mithridatic War 83–81 BC
Third Mithridatic War 75–63 BC
Hasmonean Civil War
Siege of Jerusalem (63 BC)
Roman–Parthian Wars
Crassus invasion to Mesopotamia 53 BCE
Battle of Carrhae
Antony's Parthian War
Battle of Mount Gindarus 
Siege of Jerusalem 37 BC
Antropatene campaign
Armenian campaign
Roman–Parthian War of 58–63 AD
Battle of Nisibis (217)
Aelius Gallus campaign in Arabia 24 BC
Alexandria pogroms 38 AD
Jewish–Roman wars 66–136 AD
Great Revolt of Judea 67–70 AD
Kitos War 117–119 AD
Bar Kokhba Revolt 132–136 AD
Roman-Sassanid Wars
Battle of Antioch (218)
Ardashir's raid of Mesopotamia 230–232 AD
Ardashir's second raid of Mesopotamia 237–240 AD
Battle of Resaena 243 AD
Battle of Misiche 244 AD
Battle of Barbalissos
Battle of Edessa 259
Siege of Singara 344
Siege of Amida 359
Battle of Ctesiphon (363)
Battle of Samarra 363 AD
Uprising of Syrian Legion 232 AD
Palmyrene revolt 272
Battle of Immae
Battle of Emesa
Battle of Callinicum 296
Jewish revolt against Gallus 351–352
Isauria rebellion of 404
Byzantine–Sasanian wars 421–628
Roman–Sasanian War (421–422)
Anastasian War (502–506)
Iberian War (526–532)
Battle of Callinicum 531
Roman–Persian War of 572–591
Byzantine–Sasanian War of 602–628
Antioch riots 610
Battle of Antioch (613)
Jewish revolt against Heraclius 610-28
Siege of Jerusalem (614)
Shahin's invasion of Asia Minor (615)
Sassanid conquest of Egypt 618–621
Battle of Issus
Byzantine assault on Persia 624-25
Siege of Constantinople (626)
Third Perso-Turkic War
Battle of Nineveh (627)
Samaritan Revolts 484–573
Samaritan revolt against Zeno 484
Revolt against Anastasius I
Third Samaritan revolt 529–531
Fourth Samaritan Revolt 555–572
Mazdak revolt in Persia 524 (or 528)
Nika riots in Constantinople 532
Battle of Dhi Qar – tribal rebellion in Sasanian Persia

Medieval times
Muslim conquests
Ridda wars 632–633
Muslim conquest of the Levant
Battle of Yarmouk 636
Arab conquest of Armenia
Muslim conquest of Egypt
Umayyad conquest of North Africa
Muslim conquest of Persia
First invasion of Mesopotamia
Second invasion of Mesopotamia
Battle of al-Qādisiyyah
Battle of Nahāvand
Persian Rebellion 649-51
Arab- Turgesh wars
Day of Thirst in 724
Battle of the Defile in 731
Arab–Khazar wars
Abbasid Caliphate conflicts
Abbasid revolt
Battle of the Zab 750
Arab–Byzantine wars 780–1180
Battle of Krasos 804/5
Battle of Anzen 838
Sack of Amorium 838
Sack of Damietta (853)
Battle of Lalakaon 863
John Kourkouas' campaigns
First Melitene campaign and conquest of Kalikala 926–930
Second Malitene campaign 931–934
Sayf al-Dawla campaigns
Conquest of Aleppo 944
Battle of Marash (953)
Battle of Raban 958
Battle of Andrasos 960
Siege of Aleppo 962
Siege of Aleppo 964
Mudhar-Yamani conflict 793-96
Byzantine-Paulician Wars
Battle of Bathys Ryax 872 (878?)
Persian Zoroastrian Revolts 8th–9th centuries
Behavarid revolt in Persia 8th century
Babak's revolt 816-37
Ahmad ibn al Junayd's campaign 823-24
Muhammad ibn Humayd Tusi's campaign 827-29
Afshin's campaign 835-837/838
Maziar revolt 839
Byzantine–Seljuq wars 1048–1308
Battle of Manzikert 1071
Nizari Ismaili uprising in Persia and Syria
Nizari–Seljuk conflicts 1090–1194
Crusades
People's Crusade 1095–96
First Crusade 1099
Battle of Ascalon 1099
Crusade of 1101
Battle of Ager Sanguinis 1119
Battle of Azaz 1125
Second Crusade 1145–49
Battle of Inab 1149
Baldwin's campaigns
Siege of Ascalon (1153)
Crusader invasions of Egypt 1154–69
Battle of al-Babein
Third Crusade 1189–92
Siege of Acre (1189–91)
Livonian Crusade
German Crusade
Fourth Crusade
Children's Crusade
Fifth Crusade
Sixth Crusade
Seventh Crusade
Shepherds' Crusade (1251)
Eighth Crusade
Ninth Crusade
Shepherds' Crusade (1320)
Saladin's campaigns
Egyptian revolt 1169
Darum Siege 1170
Yemen conquest 1174
Battle of Hama 1175
Capture of Damascus 1174
Battle of Jacob's Ford 1179
Fight for Mosul 1182
Battle of Al-Fule (1183)
Siege of Kerak 1183
Battle of Cresson 1187
Battle of Hattin 1187
Siege of Jerusalem (1187)
Mongol invasions to Middle East 13th century.
Battle of Köse Dağ 1243
Siege of Baghdad (1258)
Hulagu Khan's conquest of Syria 1260
Sack of Sidon 1260
Siege of Aleppo (1260)
Battle of Ain Jalut 1260
First Battle of Homs 1260
Battle of Albistan 1277
Second Battle of Homs 1281
Mongol raids into Bilad al-Sham 1299–1300
Battle of Wadi al-Khazandar 1299
Timur Conquests
Battle of Ankara (Battle of Angora) 1402
Ottoman Interregnum 1402–1413
Sheikh Bedreddin revolt 1416
Byzantine–Ottoman Wars 1265–1453
Rise of the Ottomans 1265–1328
Byzantium counter: 1328–1341
Siege of Nicaea (1328–31)
Siege of Nicomedia 1333–1337
Balkan invasion and civil war: 1341–1371
Byzantine civil war and vassalage: 1371–1394
Resumption of hostilities: 1394–1424
Ottoman campaign on Constantinopolis 1424–1453

Modern times

Early modern period

Early Ottoman expansion
Ottoman era period conflicts 1453–1516
Yazidi uprising against Safavids 1506–1510
Şahkulu Rebellion 1511

Conflicts involving the Ottoman empire
Ottoman–Persian Wars 16th–19th centuries
Battle of Chaldiran 1514
Ottoman–Safavid War (1532–55)
Ottoman–Safavid War (1578–90)
Ottoman–Safavid War (1603–18)
Battle of DimDim 1609–10
Ottoman–Safavid War (1623–39)
Abaza rebellion
Ottoman–Persian War (1730–35)
Ottoman–Persian War (1743–1746)
Ottoman–Persian War (1775–1776)
Ottoman–Persian War (1821–1823)
Jelali revolts 1519–1659
Conflicts between the Ottomans and the Druze of Mount Lebanon
1585 Ottoman expedition against the Druze
Battle of Majdel Anjar 1622
1633 conflict
1642 conflict
1660 conflict
1683–1699 conflict
Battle of Ain Dara 1711
Cretan War (1645–69)
Atmeydanı Incident
Çınar Incident 1656

Late modern period

Conflicts involving the Ottoman empire
Edirne revolt 1703
1717 Omani invasion of Bahrain
Patrona Halil uprising 1730
Zahir al-Umar Revolt (Galilee) 1742–1743
Ali Bey Al-Kabir Revolt (Egypt) 1769–1772
Bajalan uprising 1775
French campaign in Egypt and Syria 1798–1801
Cairo revolt 1798
Battle of the Nile
Siege of Jaffa
Battle of Mount Tabor (1799)
Siege of Acre (1799)
Baban uprising 1806–1808
Ottoman coups of 1807–08
Kabakçı Mustafa revolt
Muhammad Ali's campaigns
Muhammad Ali's seizure of power 1803–07
Fraser campaign (1807)
Ottoman–Saudi War 1811–18
Egyptian–Ottoman War (1831–33)
Syrian Peasant revolts
Palestine and Transjordan revolt 1834
Alawite revolt (1834–35) 
1838 Druze revolt
Egyptian–Ottoman War (1839–41)
Russo-Persian War (1826–28)
Cizre uprising 1829
Atçalı Kel Mehmet revolt 1829–30
Prince Mohammad of Soran uprising 1833
Yezidi uprising 1837
Sîncar uprising 1837

Ottoman Tanzimat period
First Botan uprising 1843
Bedr Khan Bey uprising 1843
Culemerg uprising 1843
Bedirhan Bey uprising 1847
Massacre of Aleppo (1850)
Yezdan Sher uprising 1855
1860 Druze–Maronite conflict
French expedition in Syria 1860–61
Qatari–Bahraini War 1867–68
Russo-Turkish War (1877–78)
Urabi Revolt (Egypt) 1879–82
Shaykh 'Ubaydullah of Nehri and Shemdinan uprising 1880–1881
Royal Civil War in Arabia 1887–91
Battle of Mulayda 1891
1892 Tobacco Rebellion (Iran)
Hamidian massacres 1894–96
Zeitun Rebellion (1895–96)
Unification of Saudi Arabia
Saudi–Rashidi War 1903–06
Persian Constitutional Revolution 1908–09
Young Turk Revolution 1908–09
31 March Incident 1909
Adana massacre 1909
Hauran Druze Rebellion 1909
Zaraniq rebellion 1909–1910 (c. 830+ fatalities)
1913 Ottoman coup d'état
Middle Eastern theatre of World War I 1914–1918
Sinai and Palestine Campaign
Mesopotamian campaign
Caucasus Campaign
Persian Campaign
Gallipoli Campaign
North African Campaign (World War I)
Arab Revolt
Armenian genocide
Assyrian genocide
1st Dersim rebellion

Post-Ottoman era conflicts

See also
Conflicts in the Horn of Africa
List of conflicts in Africa
List of conflicts in Asia
List of conflicts in Central America
List of conflicts in Europe
List of conflicts in North America
List of conflicts in South America
List of modern conflicts in North Africa
List of modern conflicts in the Middle East

References

History of the Middle East
Middle East
Middle East-related lists
Middle East
Military history of Asia